Greg Francis (born April 4, 1974 in Toronto, Ontario) is the head coach of the UOIT Ridgebacks men's basketball team, as well as the manager of men's high performance at Canada Basketball.  He was previously the head coach of the University of Waterloo Warriors men's basketball team and the head coach of the University of Alberta Golden Bears, where he replaced coach Don Horwood, who manned the Bears bench for 26 seasons.  Francis was also the head coach of the Canadian junior men’s national team, assistant coach of the Canadian senior men's national team and the Canadian men's basketball national coach.

Francis was a member of the Canadian National men's basketball team, that finished seventh in the 2000 Summer Olympics in Sydney, Australia and fourth at the 2003 Tournament of the Americas.

Collegiate career
Francis played for the Fairfield University basketball team from 1994 to 1997, finishing his career with 1,570 points, ranking fifth all-time at the school. He also holds the school record for most three-point baskets made in a career with 230. During his senior season, he helped lead the Stags to the Metro Atlantic Athletic Conference title and the 1997 NCAA Division I men's basketball tournament.

He almost single-handedly upset the North Carolina Tar Heels in the first round of the tournament scoring 26 points including eight three-pointers. Following the game, North Carolina coach Dean Smith said "I had to find Francis after the game but I couldn't shake his hand because it was so hot."

Fairfield recognized his accomplishments in 2003 when the school inducted Francis into its Athletic Hall of Fame.

Professional career
Francis played professionally in the British Basketball League for the Worthing Bears and was selected to the UK All-Star Team during the 1997-98 season and the Chester Jets during the 1999-00 season.

External links
Team Canada Profile
Alberta Golden Bears Profile

References

1974 births
Living people
Basketball players from Toronto
Basketball players at the 2000 Summer Olympics
Basketball players at the 2003 Pan American Games
Black Canadian basketball players
Canadian men's basketball coaches
Canadian expatriate basketball people in the United States
Canadian expatriate sportspeople in England
Canadian men's basketball players
Cheshire Jets players
Fairfield Stags men's basketball players
Monmouth Hawks men's basketball coaches
Olympic basketball players of Canada
Pan American Games competitors for Canada
Worthing Bears players
1998 FIBA World Championship players
Guards (basketball)